The St. Boniface Canadiens was a Manitoba Junior Hockey League team that operated from 1952-1964.  The St. Boniface Canadiens won 4 Turnbull Cup Championships as Manitoba Junior Champions, 1953, 1954, 1956,  & 1958.  

The franchise was founded in 1935 and moved from Winnipeg to St. Boniface, Manitoba in 1952.  It had previously played as the Woodhaven Maple Leafs, St. James Canadians, St. James Orioles, and Winnipeg Canadiens.

The 1953 St. Boniface Canadiens won the Abbott Cup as western Canadian champions by defeating the Lethbridge Native Sons. They played the 1953 Memorial Cup final against the Barrie Flyers, losing the best-of-seven series in six games.  The 1953 Canadiens were inducted into the Manitoba Hockey Hall of Fame in the team category.

The Canadiens become the Winnipeg Warriors from 1964 to 1967.

During the summer of 1967, community-minded sports group purchased the Winnipeg Warriors  from Ben Hatskin, after which the team became known as the Kildonan North Stars.

Season-by-season record
Note: GP = Games Played, W = Wins, L = Losses, T = Ties, OTL = Overtime Losses, GF = Goals for, GA = Goals against

NHL Alumni

External links 
 1953 St. Boniface Canadiens at Manitoba Hockey Hall of Fame

Defunct Manitoba Junior Hockey League teams
Ice hockey teams in Winnipeg
Saint Boniface, Winnipeg